Karnaukhivka is an urban-type settlement in Kamianske Raion of Dnipropetrovsk Oblast in Ukraine. Karnaukhivka belongs to Kamianske urban hromada, one of the hromadas of Ukraine. Population: 

Until 18 July 2020, Karnaukhivka belonged to Kamianske municipality, the administrative division subordinated to the city of oblast significance of Kamianske. The municipality was abolished in July 2020 as part of the administrative reform of Ukraine, which reduced the number of raions of Dnipropetrovsk Oblast to seven. The area of Kamianske Municipality was merged into the newly established Kamianske Raion.

Economy

Transportation
The railway which connects Dnipro and Kamianske with further connections to Kryvyi Rih crosses Karnaukhivka. There are two railway stops on this railway within Karnaukhivka, 164 km and 165 km. Another railway runs from Dnipro to the center of Kamianske, but it does not have passenger service.

Karnaukhivka has a network of paved roads which connect it with both Dnipro and Kamianske.

References

Urban-type settlements in Kamianske Raion
Populated places on the Dnieper in Ukraine